Neotrombidium is a genus of velvet mites and chiggers in the family Neotrombidiidae. There are at least three described species in Neotrombidium.

Species
These three species belong to the genus Neotrombidium:
 Neotrombidium beeri b
 Neotrombidium helladicum Cooreman, 1960 g
 Neotrombidium samsinaki (Daniel, 1963) g
Data sources: i = ITIS, c = Catalogue of Life, g = GBIF, b = Bugguide.net

References

Further reading

External links

 

Trombidiformes